Jiřina Němcová (née Vobořilová; 3 April 1937 – 15 August 2018) was a former Czech athlete. She competed at the 1956, 1960 and the 1964 Summer Olympics. Her husband Zdeněk Němec, was also a Czechoslovak athlete.

References

External links
 

1937 births
2018 deaths
Athletes (track and field) at the 1956 Summer Olympics
Athletes (track and field) at the 1960 Summer Olympics
Athletes (track and field) at the 1964 Summer Olympics
Czech female high jumpers
Czech female discus throwers
Olympic athletes of Czechoslovakia
Athletes from Prague